Natural science is a branch of science concerning life sciences and physical sciences.

Natural science(s) may also refer to:

Natural Science, academic journal published by Scientific Research Publishing
Natural Sciences (Cambridge), series of courses at the University of Cambridge
"Natural Science" (song), by the band Rush

See also
List of natural history museums
Outline of natural science